Graham Linehan (born 1968) is an Irish television writer and anti-transgender activist. He created or co-created the sitcoms Father Ted (1995–1998), Black Books (2000–2004) and The IT Crowd (2006–2013). He has also written for Count Arthur Strong, Brass Eye and The Fast Show.

After an episode of The IT Crowd was criticised as transphobic in 2008, Linehan became involved in anti-transgender activism. He argues that transgender activism endangers women and he has likened the use of puberty blockers to Nazi eugenics. In 2020, he was suspended from the social network Twitter for "repeated violations" of the rules. Linehan said he was a victim of cancel culture, and that his views had lost him work and ended his marriage. His Twitter account was restored in 2022.

Early life

Linehan was born in Dublin in 1968. He attended Plunkett's School in Whitehall, on Dublin's northside, followed by Catholic University School, a Roman Catholic secondary school for boys also in Dublin, before joining Hot Press.

Career
 
Linehan and Arthur Mathews met while working at Hot Press. In their early collaborations, they were responsible for segments in sketch shows including Alas Smith and Jones, Harry Enfield and Chums, The All New Alexei Sayle Show, The Day Today and the Ted and Ralph characters in The Fast Show. They continued their collaboration with Paris (one series, 1994), Father Ted (three series, 1995–1998), and the first series of the sketch show Big Train.

They also wrote the "Dearth of A Salesman" episode for the series Coogan's Run, which featured the character Gareth Cheeseman. In late 2003, they were named one of the 50 funniest acts to work in television by The Observer.

Linehan has written for other shows, including Brass Eye. With Dylan Moran, he co-wrote the first series of Black Books, a series to which Mathews also contributed. Linehan also contributed material to Blue Jam, and its television adaptation Jam.

Linehan wrote and directed the 2006 Channel 4 sitcom The IT Crowd, in which he sought to move away from the recent British trend towards mock-documentary comedies. Unlike many series of the time, it was recorded before a studio audience. In November 2008, he was awarded an International Emmy for The IT Crowd. In 2013, he wrote and directed The Walshes. He co-wrote the first series of the BBC sitcom Motherland and directed its pilot episode.

In 2018, Linehan and Mathews announced plans for a Father Ted musical. In 2021, Linehan said he was still developing the musical and that it would finish the series as they had planned it before the death of lead actor Dermot Morgan. In March 2022, Linehan said the musical had been cancelled by producers following the controversy over his views on transgender rights.

Television appearances

Both Linehan and Mathews have made cameos in programmes they have written. They also made an appearance in the sitcom I'm Alan Partridge as two Irish TV producers considering Alan Partridge (Steve Coogan) for a contract.

Linehan has also appeared in The Day Today and in two episodes of Garth Marenghi's Darkplace, and has had cameos in Black Books (series one, episode two, as "I love books" Guy, and series one, episode five as Fast Food Customer), and the Father Ted episodes "Good Luck Father Ted", "Entertaining Father Stone", "Flight Into Terror", "Cigarettes, Alcohol and Rollerblading" and "Chirpy Burpy Cheap Sheep". He had cameos in four episodes of The IT Crowd: as Messy Joe's Restaurant Musician, in series one, episode three; the blind sorcerer, in series two, Episode six; as a member of the audience for Jen's speech, in series three, episode four; and as Beth Gaga Shaggy, in series four, episode three. He appeared in the Identity Parade round of Never Mind the Buzzcocks. He also appeared in the pilot of Little Britain, as well as in series one, episode four, as a bystander who gets in the way of character Kenny Craig when he is attempting to hypnotise, from a distance, a man whose car he has crashed into. He also appeared in series one, episode five, in which he played a journalist called Roy Sloan (from Whizzer and Chips) during a conference with Prime Minister Michael Stevens (Anthony Head). Linehan was one of the writers interviewed by Charlie Brooker in a special interview episode of the fifth series of Brooker's Screenwipe programme, and again on Brooker's Gameswipe in 2010. Linehan also appeared as a guest panellist on Have I Got News for You in 2011 and again in 2012, and he made his debut as a guest on the BBC show QI in the 11th series (K series) in 2013, receiving a score of −19.

In 2007, a documentary about Linehan, his life and his career was produced by Wildfire Films for RTÉ One. This documentary explored the art, craft and deeply competitive business of creating contemporary television comedy. The programme featured interviews with several of the UK's most successful television comedy writers and performers including Steve Coogan, Matt Lucas, David Walliams, Paul Whitehouse, Griff Rhys Jones and Ardal O'Hanlon, all of whom have worked with Linehan. It was directed by Adrian McCarthy and produced by Martha O'Neill and Adam Rynne. In 2011, Linehan also appeared with several members of the cast in Channel 4's Father Ted Night, an evening of the writer's favourite episodes and two retrospective documentaries.

Radio appearances

On 6 June 2011, Linehan appeared on BBC Radio 4's Today programme to discuss his adaptation of the Ealing comedy film The Ladykillers for the West End stage. During this appearance, Linehan took issue with Today presenter Justin Webb over what he saw as the attempted staging of an artificial argument between himself and the critic Michael Billington. He later expanded on this criticism in an article published in The Guardian, saying "I'm talking about that very specific, very artificial, very Today programme format of a presenter acting as referee between two people who have been chosen to represent the opposing sides of a manufactured argument. It is a binary view of politics, of life and, as a result, it is also a dishonest one. Replace it with anything – anything – because anything would be better".

Other work
Linehan's children voiced characters in the 2012 Adventure Time episode "Goliad", with Linehan directing the children while taking the producers' instructions over the phone. Linehan planned to write a sequel episode, and sent versions of the story to the production team. This episode was never made as Adventure Time ended in 2018.

Anti-transgender activism 

Linehan is noted internationally for his anti-transgender activism. He became involved after the airing of a 2008 episode of The IT Crowd, written by Linehan, was widely criticised as transphobic and sexist; critics said it used gender stereotypes and trivialised violence against transgender women. The episode features a man who learns that his girlfriend is transgender and gets into a fight with her. Linehan felt the joke was "harmless" and says he did not understand the "ferocity" of the response, arguing that a transphobic character did not make him or the episode transphobic.

Linehan said he was sceptical of gender self-identification, objecting to "privileged white people saying you must accept anyone who says they are a woman". He said that "anyone suffering from gender dysphoria needs to be helped and supported", but voiced concern over early transgender intervention for children. He used the social network Twitter to criticise "trans ideology", which he believes misrepresents transgender people and lesbians.

In 2018, Linehan praised anti-transgender protesters at that year's London Pride event who had carried banners and flyers saying that "transactivism erases lesbians", calling them "heroes". Later that year, Stephanie Hayden, a transgender woman, sued Linehan for harassment. Hayden alleged that Linehan had shared photos on Twitter of Hayden's family and her life before transition, suggested she was a criminal and repeatedly misgendered and deadnamed her. Linehan in turn alleged that Hayden publicised several private addresses linked to his family to silence him. Police issued Linehan a verbal warning not to contact Hayden.

In a December 2018 interview with Derrick Jensen, Linehan remarked that "I'm now in a position where I can answer the question honestly of, if you were around at the time of something terrible happening like Nazism, or whatever it happened to be, would you be one of the people who said 'no, this is wrong', despite being opposed?". He also described the trans movement as providing "cover" for "fetishists, con-men, and simply abusive misogynists". In an interview with the BBC television programme Newsnight in February 2020, Linehan said that the Tavistock Centre's practice of treating children with puberty blockers such as Lupron was comparable to Nazi eugenics and experiments on children. Following this interview, Eric Pickles, the United Kingdom Special Envoy for Post-Holocaust Issues, accused Linehan of "trivialising the Holocaust".

In January 2019, Linehan expressed concern over the news that Mermaids, a charitable advocacy organisation for transgender children and teenagers, was to receive a £500,000 lottery grant to open clinics around the United Kingdom. He posted to the blogging website Mumsnet encouraging its users to lobby the National Lottery Community Fund to reverse its decision. The grant was reviewed and went ahead. In response to Linehan, YouTuber Hbomberguy held a 57-hour fundraising livestream that raised £270,000 more for Mermaids. In the same year, the British journalist Dawn Foster accused Linehan and others of targeting a National Society for the Prevention of Cruelty to Children (NSPCC) employee who had been responsible for the charity hiring the model and activist Munroe Bergdof, a transgender woman. Foster called the online abuse "transphobic" and "flatly homophobic". The journalist Chris Godfrey called the treatment of the employee "insidious homophobia".

In June 2020, Linehan criticised comments made about the author J. K. Rowling after she made comments that were called transphobic. He linked to a blog post featuring screenshots of abuse Rowling had received, describing those who wrote them as "ignoring the abuse received by women who speak out against gender ideology" and "literally useless". Hozier, tagged in Linehan's tweets due to his trans-rights advocacy, responded by saying Linehan was conducting an "obsessive little culture war".

On 27 June 2020, Linehan's Twitter account was permanently suspended following what Twitter called "repeated violations of our rules against hateful conduct and platform manipulation". In December, Linehan evaded the suspension with an account posing as a transgender man. He used the account to accuse Colm O'Gorman of being "a traitor to women, gay people and yourself" for signing an open letter published by the Transgender Equality Network of Ireland. The account was banned but Linehan said he had created another. Linehan's Twitter account was unbanned in December 2022, following the takeover of Twitter by Elon Musk, who relaxed many of Twitter's content policies.

In February 2021, Linehan created a fake account on the lesbian dating app Her and publicly posted screenshots of non-binary people and trans women using it. The developers of Her clarified that transgender women are welcome on the app. In March 2021, Linehan gave oral evidence to the Communications and Digital Committee of the House of Lords on the subject of freedom of expression online. He said he had used his platform on Twitter to bring attention to what he described as "an all-out assault on women, on their words, their dignity and their safety". In an interview in the Irish Independent that month, Linehan said his activism had cost him work; he ruled out working with Channel 4 in future as they would not return the controversial IT Crowd episode to broadcast, and he said he would not work with the BBC as they had depicted a transgender lesbian couple, which Linehan described as "a heterosexual couple", in a CBeebies video.

In an interview with the BBC presenter Stephen Nolan on 24 March 2022, Linehan said that the debate over transgender issues had "consumed his life", and said that the producers had cancelled the Father Ted musical because of his views. He blamed cancel culture for his situation, and said: "Every comedian at the moment is living under a kind of state of permanent blackmail ... There's a few hot-button issues where you have to follow a certain line and if you don't, you'll be destroyed." Ahead of the 2022 Australian federal election in May, Linehan used his online platforms to rally international support for Liberal Party candidate Katherine Deves, who had attracted public controversy and condemnation from within her party after her track record of making anti-trans comments was brought to light in the press. In a September 2022 interview, Linehan said that his anti-trans activism had led him to question the safety of COVID-19 vaccinations and the scientific consensus on climate change "because I've been lied to so conclusively by all the people I used to trust".

Personal life 
Linehan was married to the writer Helen Serafinowicz, the sister of the actor Peter Serafinowicz; they have two children. In October 2015, Graham and Helen Linehan worked with Amnesty International on a campaign film calling on the Irish government to repeal the Eighth Amendment of the Constitution, which "acknowledges the right to life of the unborn and, with due regard to the equal right to life of the mother, guarantees in its laws to respect, and, as far as practicable, by its laws to defend and vindicate that right". The couple revealed their decision for Helen to abort a foetus with acrania while living in England in 2004, and their discovery that undergoing the procedure in Ireland would have been an offence carrying a maximum 14-year prison sentence. In 2021, Linehan said that he and Serafinowicz had separated following financial problems caused by his activism against the transgender community.

Linehan is an atheist. In January 2009 he helped to publicise the Atheist Bus Campaign. He is also an honorary associate of the National Secular Society.

In June 2018, Linehan announced that he is a survivor of testicular cancer.

Linehan is an active Twitter user, calling it "part of his nervous system". On 13 February 2009, Linehan hosted the first BadMovieClub on Twitter which repeated the next day at midnight, hosted by Phill Jupitus. In August 2009, in response to criticism of the National Health Service by the US Republican Party, Linehan created the #welovetheNHS campaign on Twitter. In 2011, he perpetrated a Twitter hoax that Osama Bin Laden was a fan of The IT Crowd.

Credits

Television director
 Father Ted (8 episodes, 1997)
 Big Train (6 episodes, 1998)
 Black Books (6 episodes, 2000)
 Little Britain (1 episode, 2003)
 The IT Crowd (25 episodes, 2006–13)
 Count Arthur Strong (20 episodes, 2013–17)
 The Walshes (3 episodes, 2013)
 Shrink (3 episodes, 2017)
 Motherland (Pilot Episode, 2016)
Linehan was also an executive producer of the first series of The IT Crowd, and an associate producer of one episode of Father Ted.

Film director
 Hello Friend (short, also co-writer, 2003)

Film writer
 Never Mind the Horrocks (television movie, 1996)
 The Matchmaker (1997)

Awards and nominations

References

External links

 
 
 Why, That's Delightful: Graham Linehan's blog
 Category Archives: Graham Linehan - Complete scans of Graham's articles written for Neon Magazine
 Writing for Performance: Graham Linehan interviews and writing advice
 

21st-century Irish screenwriters
Father Ted
Hot Press people
Irish abortion-rights activists
Irish atheists
Irish bloggers
Irish comedy writers
Irish expatriates in England
Irish humorists
Irish male screenwriters
Irish satirists
Irish screenwriters
Irish television directors
Irish television writers
Living people
Male bloggers
Male television writers
Writers from Dublin (city)
Transphobia in the United Kingdom
1968 births